Anethoporus is a genus of spirostreptid millipedes native to northern South America, where they range from Peru to the islands of Trinidad and Tobago. The genus and type species, A. clarki, was established by Ralph V. Chamberlin in 1918.

Species
Anethoporus contains eight species, some previously assigned to other genera.

Anethoporus clarki Chamberlin, 1918 - Trinidad and Tobago
Anethoporus gracilior Chamberlin, 1918 - Trinidad and Tobago
Anethoporus gracilis (Verhoeff, 1941) - Peru
Anethoporus guayrensis (Silvestri, 1896) - Venezuela
Anethoporus leviceps (Attems, 1950) - Venezuela
Anethoporus ornatus (Verhoeff, 1941) -  Venezuela
Anethoporus schalleri (Kraus, 1960) -  Peru
Anethoporus silvaticus (Verhoeff, 1941) - Peru

References

Spirostreptida
Millipedes of South America